George Gounter or Gunter (c. 1646 – 1718) of Racton, Sussex, was an English politician who sat in the House of Commons in 1685.

Gounter was returned as Member of Parliament  for Chichester in 1685.

Gounter's son Charles Gounter Nicoll was also a Member of Parliament.

References

1646 births
1718 deaths
English MPs 1685–1687
People from Chichester District